Arthur Lawes was a professional rugby league footballer in the Australian New South Wales Rugby League competition. Lawes played for the Eastern Suburbs club, playing 4 matches in the year 1909.

References
 The Encyclopedia Of Rugby League Players; Alan Whiticker & Glen Hudson
 History Of The New South Wales Rugby League; Steve Haddan

Australian rugby league players
Sydney Roosters players
Year of birth missing
Year of death missing
Place of birth missing